Matopo is a genus of moths of the family Noctuidae. The genus was erected by William Lucas Distant in 1898.

Species
Matopo actinophora Hampson, 1909 Kenya, Tanzania
Matopo berhanoui Laporte, 1984 Ethiopia
Matopo descarpentriesi (Laporte, 1975)
Matopo giacomellii Dognin, 1916 Argentina
Matopo heterochroa Hampson, 1916 Somalia
Matopo inangulata Hampson, 1909 Zimbabwe
Matopo neotropicalis Jones, 1908 Brazil (Paraná)
Matopo oberthueri Viette, 1965 Madagascar
Matopo plurilineata Berio, 1955 Madagascar
Matopo scutulata Janse, 1938 South Africa
Matopo selecta (Walker, 1865) Punjab, Bombay, Senegal, Nigeria, Chad, Sudan, Egypt
Matopo socotrensis Hacker & Saldaitis, 2010 Sokotra
Matopo subarida Viette, 1976 Madagascar
Matopo tamsi Kiriakoff, 1954 Zaire
Matopo typica Distant, 1898 South Africa, Zimbabwe

References

Hadeninae
Noctuoidea genera